Chin Dae-je is a South-Korean businessman and former politician. He was born on January 20, 1952, in Uiryeong, South Gyeongsang Province.

Biography
He attended Gyeonggi High School and then studied Electrical Engineering at Seoul National University (B.S. and M.S.), the University of Massachusetts Amherst  (M.S.) and Stanford (Ph.D). From 1985 he worked for Samsung, and served as president of their Digital Media Business from 2000–2003.

He became Minister of Information and Communication in February, 2003.

He resigned from the government in early 2006, and ran for the governorship of Gyeonggi Province on the ruling Uri Party ticket.  However he lost to Kim Moon-soo, the candidate of Grand National Party, as part of the widespread electoral revolt against the incumbent ruling party. He was however the only candidate to collect more than 30% of the votes by a ruling Uri-party candidate in all of the contests in the whole nation, except Governor Kim Wan-ju of Jeollabukdo.
 
He gave a plenary talk at International Solid State Circuit Conference (ISSCC), 2005.

Chin was elected a member of the National Academy of Engineering in 2020 for innovations and industry leadership in semiconductor technology.

External links
 korea.net profile
 businessweek.com article

References

1952 births
Living people
Seoul National University alumni
Stanford University alumni
University of Massachusetts Amherst College of Engineering alumni
Uri Party politicians
Government ministers of South Korea
Yeoyang Jin clan